The Fugitive (Chinese: 亡命徒) is a 1972 Hong Kong film.  Siu and Ma are two bandits who ride from town to town robbing banks and killing anyone who tries to stop them. When a hold up goes wrong, Siu is caught, and soon realizes that Ma has kept the money and isn't coming to rescue him.

References

External links
 

1972 films
Hong Kong action films
1970s action films
Mandarin-language films
1970s Hong Kong films